Barak or Barák is a surname. Notable people with the surname include:

 Aharon Barak (born 1936), former President of the Supreme Court of Israel
 Boaz Barak (born 1974), Israeli-American computer scientist
 Ehud Barak (born 1942), Israeli former Prime Minister and Minister of Defense
 Josef Barák (1833–1883), Czech politician, journalist, and poet
 Jindřich Barák (born 1991), Czech ice hockey player
 Ronald Barak (born 1943), American Olympic gymnast
 Valia Barak (born 1969), Peruvian journalist
 William Barak (1824–1903), last traditional elder of the Wurundjeri-willam clan in Australia
 Ze'ev Barak, a pen name of Wolf Blitzer (born 1948), a German-American writer and TV news anchor
  (1974—2012), Israeli model and pornographic actor

See also
Barac (disambiguation)
Barack (disambiguation)
B-R-K
B-R-Q

Hebrew-language surnames